Jerome "Tra" Blake is an American football official in the National Football League (NFL) since the 2020 NFL season, wearing uniform number 33 until ; he now wears uniform number 3.

Career
Blake officiated in Conference USA and the Atlantic Coast Conference, where he worked at deep wing and referee positions. Blake was also a referee for the Alliance of American Football in 2019 and the XFL in 2020.

Blake was hired by the NFL in 2020 as a field judge. He was re-assigned to the umpire position in 2021, and was promoted to referee for the start of the 2022 NFL season following the retirement of Tony Corrente. He became the eighth African-American NFL official to be promoted to the referee position in their career.

Blake was the referee during the biggest come-from-behind victory in NFL history when the Vikings rallied to win after falling behind by 33 points. The game was not without controversy for Blake as two apparent fumble recoveries for defensive touchdowns by Chandon Sullivan were nullified due to the plays being blown dead by Blake's crew.

2022 Crew 
R: Tra Blake 
 U: Tony Michalek
 DJ: Patrick Turner
 LJ: Mark Stewart
 FJ: Tom Hill
 SJ: Don Willard
 BJ: Todd Prukop
 RO: Andrew Lambert
 RA: Kirt Shay

Personal life
Blake resides in Clermont, Florida. Outside of the NFL, Blake is a quality assurance director for an Orlando-based pharmaceutical software company.

References

Living people
African-American sports officials
National Football League officials
Year of birth missing (living people)
People from Clermont, Florida